Farm River can refer to:

 Farm River (Connecticut), a short river near New Haven, Connecticut 
 Farm River (Massachusetts), a short river near Boston, Massachusetts